

Administrative and municipal divisions

References

Samara Oblast
Samara Oblast